Liberté is a station on line 8 of the Paris Métro in the commune of Charenton-le-Pont.

The station opened on 5 October 1942 with the extension of the line from Porte de Charenton to the Charenton - Écoles. It is named after the Avenue de la Liberté ("Liberty Avenue"), which runs above the station.

Nearby are the Pelouse de Reuilly and the Vélodrome Jacques Anquetil in the Bois de Vincennes.

Station layout

Paris Métro stations in Charenton-le-Pont
Railway stations in France opened in 1942